A Wheatstone bridge is an electrical circuit used to measure an unknown electrical resistance by balancing two legs of a bridge circuit, one leg of which includes the unknown component. The primary benefit of the circuit is its ability to provide extremely accurate measurements (in contrast with something like a simple voltage divider). Its operation is similar to the original potentiometer.

The Wheatstone bridge was invented by Samuel Hunter Christie (sometimes spelled "Christy") in 1833 and improved and popularized by Sir Charles Wheatstone in 1843.  One of the Wheatstone bridge's initial uses was for soil analysis and comparison.

Operation 
In the figure,  is the fixed, yet unknown, resistance to be measured.

The resistance  is adjusted until the bridge is "balanced" and no current flows through the  galvanometer . At this point, the potential difference between the two midpoints (B and D) will be zero. Therefore the ratio of the two resistances in the known leg  is equal to the ratio of the two resistances in the unknown leg . If the bridge is unbalanced, the direction of the current indicates whether  is too high or too low.

At the point of balance,

Detecting zero current with a galvanometer can be done to extremely high precision. Very small changes in  disrupt the balance and are readily detected.

This setup is frequently used in strain gauge and resistance thermometer measurements, as it is usually faster to read a voltage level off a meter than to adjust a resistance to zero the voltage.

Derivation

Quick derivation at balance 
At the point of balance, both the voltage and the current between the two midpoints (B and D) are zero. Therefore, and:

Full derivation using Kirchhoff's circuit laws 
First, Kirchhoff's first law is used to find the currents in junctions B and D:

Then, Kirchhoff's second law is used for finding the voltage in the loops ABDA and BCDB:

When the bridge is balanced, then , so the second set of equations can be rewritten as:

Then, equation (1) is divided by equation (2) and the resulting equation is rearranged, giving:

On the other hand, if the resistance of the galvanometer is high enough that  is negligible, it is possible to compute  from the three other resistor values and the supply voltage, or the supply voltage from all four resistor values. To do so, one has to work out the voltage from each potential divider and subtract one from the other. The equations for this are:

where  is the voltage of node D relative to node B.

Significance 

The Wheatstone bridge illustrates the concept of a difference measurement, which can be extremely accurate. Variations on the Wheatstone bridge can  be used to measure capacitance, inductance, impedance and other quantities, such as the amount of combustible gases in a sample, with an explosimeter.  The Kelvin bridge was specially adapted from the Wheatstone bridge for measuring very low resistances.  In many cases, the significance of measuring the unknown resistance is related to measuring the impact of some physical phenomenon (such as force, temperature, pressure, etc.) which thereby allows the use of Wheatstone bridge in measuring those elements indirectly.

Modifications of the fundamental bridge

The Wheatstone bridge is the fundamental bridge, but there are other modifications that can be made to measure various kinds of resistances when the fundamental Wheatstone bridge is not suitable. Some of the modifications are:
 Carey Foster bridge, for measuring small resistances
 Kelvin bridge, for measuring small four-terminal resistances
 Maxwell bridge, and Wien bridge for measuring reactive components
 Anderson's bridge, for measuring the self-inductance of the circuit, an advanced form of Maxwell’s bridge

See also

 Diode bridge, product mixer – diode bridges
 Phantom circuit – a circuit using a balanced bridge
 Post office box (electricity)
 Potentiometer (measuring instrument)
 Potential divider
 Ohmmeter
 Resistance thermometer
 Strain gauge

References

External links

 DC Metering Circuits chapter from Lessons In Electric Circuits Vol 1 DC free ebook and Lessons In Electric Circuits series.
 Test Set I-49

Electrical meters
Bridge circuits
Measuring instruments
English inventions
Impedance measurements

pl:Mostek (elektronika)#Mostek Wheatstone'a